The Pratt & Whitney JT8D is a low-bypass (0.96 to 1) turbofan engine introduced by Pratt & Whitney in February 1963 with the inaugural flight of the Boeing 727. It was a modification of the Pratt & Whitney J52 turbojet engine which powered the US Navy A-6 Intruder and A-4 Skyhawk attack aircraft. Eight models comprise the JT8D standard engine family, covering the thrust range from 12,250 to 17,400 pounds-force (62 to 77 kN), and power 727, 737-100/200, and DC-9. The updated JT8D-200 family, covering the 18,900 to 21,000 pounds-force (84 to 93 kN), powers the MD-80 and re-engined Super 27 aircraft. The JT8D was built under license in Sweden as the Volvo RM8, a redesigned afterburning derivative for the Saab 37 Viggen fighter. Pratt & Whitney also sells static versions for powerplant and ship propulsion as the FT8.

Design

The JT8D is an axial-flow front turbofan engine incorporating a two-spool design. There are two coaxially-mounted independent rotating assemblies: one rotating assembly for the low pressure compressor (LPC) which consists of the first six stages (i.e. six pairs of rotating and stator blades, including the first two stages which are for the bypass turbofan), driven by the second (downstream) turbine (which consists of three stages); and a second rotating assembly for the high-pressure compressor (HPC) section, which has seven stages.  The high-pressure compressor is driven by the first (upstream) turbine, which has a single stage.

The front-mounted bypass fan has two stages. The annular discharge duct for the bypass fan runs along the full length of the engine, so that both the fan air and exhaust gases can exit through the same nozzle.  This arrangement allows some noise attenuation, in that the still-hot fast-moving turbine exhaust is shrouded in much-cooler and slower-moving air (from the bypass fan) before interacting with ambient air.  Thus, the JT8D noise levels were significantly reduced from previous non-turbofan engines, although the low bypass ratio meant that, compared to subsequently developed turbofans, high noise levels were still produced.

Within the fan inlet case, there are anti-icing air bosses and probes to sense the inlet pressure and temperature.  Similar units exist throughout the engine to check temperatures and pressures.

At the 13th (i.e. the final) compressor stage, air is bled out and used for anti-icing.  The amount is controlled by the Pressure Ratio Bleed Control sense signal (PRBC).  The diffuser case at the aft end of the compressor houses the 13th stage.  Its increasing cross-sectional area allows the compressed air to slow down before entering one of the engine's nine burner cans.  Again, there are two bosses to extract 13th stage air for anti-icing, de-icing of fuel, and airframe (cabin pressurization) use.  Not all the compressed air enters the burner cans at the fuel-ignition point; some bypasses the can completely and cools the first turbine stage, and some is gradually introduced into the burner can's perimeter in such a way that the burning fuel is held near the can's centerline.

There are nine combustion chambers positioned in a can-annular arrangement. Each chamber has three air inlet hole sizes: the smallest is for cooling, the medium is for burning and the largest for forming an air blanket.

Update programs

In response to environmental concerns that began in the 1970s, the company began developing a new version of the engine, the JT8D-200 series. Designed to be quieter, cleaner, more efficient, yet more powerful than earlier models, the -200 Series power-plant was re-engineered with a significantly higher bypass ratio (1.74 to 1) covering the 18,500 to 21,700 pound-force (82 to 97 kN) thrust range and powering the McDonnell Douglas MD-80 series. Overall engine pressure ratio was also increased from 15.4 to 21.0. Since entering service in 1980, more than 2,900 of the -200 series engines have been produced.

The JT8D-217 and -219 engine(s) were tested in 2001 and were deemed suitable replacements for the old TF33 engines on military and commercial aircraft as part of the Super 27 re-engining program.  The updated engines offer reduced (Stage-3) noise compliance standards without the need for hush kits, enhanced short field performance, and steeper and faster climb rates with roughly a 10% reduction in fuel burn for extended range.

Pratt & Whitney, in a joint venture with Seven Q Seven (SQS) and Omega Air, has developed the JT8D-219 as a re-engine powerplant for Boeing 707-based aircraft. Northrop Grumman used the -219 to re-engine one of the United States Air Force's fleet of 19 Joint Surveillance Target Attack Radar System (E-8 Joint STARS) aircraft, which would allow the JSTARS more time on station due to the engine's 17%  greater fuel efficiency. NATO plans to re-engine their fleet of E-3 Sentry AWACS aircraft. The -219 is publicized as being half the cost of the competing 707 re-engine powerplant, the CFM International CFM56, for reasons of geometrical and balance similarity to the engine it is replacing and the associated relative up-front wing modification costs of the two choices.

The proposed Aerion SBJ supersonic business jet, previously under development, was to use a pair of JT8D-219 engines for sustained supersonic flight.

Variants

Production
More than 14,000 JT8D engines have been produced, totaling more than one-half billion hours of service, with more than 350 operators, making it the most popular of all low-bypass turbofan engines ever produced.  Regular production ended in 1985, but some replacement engines were produced for military aircraft in 2011. Mainline airline use of the JT8D continued until 2020 when Delta Airlines retired their MD-88 fleet early due to the COVID-19 pandemic.

Applications

 Aerion SBJ – proposed, not built
 Boeing 707RE
 Boeing 727 - Re-Engined Super 27s have JT8D-200s
 Boeing 737-100 & -200
 Dassault Mercure
 Kawasaki C-1
 McDonnell Douglas DC-9
 McDonnell Douglas MD-80 series - JT8D-200s only
 McDonnell Douglas YC-15
 Northrop Grumman E-8C Joint STARS – single testbed only 
 Sud Aviation Caravelle 10B, 10R, 11R, and 12
 Pratt & Whitney FT8 MobilePac and SwiftPac mobile generators

Accidents

18 January 1969United Airlines Flight 266 – Ten minutes after takeoff, the cockpit received a warning from Engine 1 of an engine fire and cut off power to that engine. A minute later, Flight UA266 suffered a total loss of electrical power, which disabled the aircraft's flight instruments. At 13 minutes after take-off, the plane crashed into the Pacific Ocean, just 12 miles off the coast, killing all 38 people aboard the aircraft, which consisted of 32 passengers and six crew members.   
4 April 1977Southern Airways Flight 242 – both engines on the DC-9 failed when the pilots flew into a severe thunderstorm after misreading their onboard radar.  The flight encountered severe rain and hail.  The NTSB concluded that the "loss of thrust was caused by the ingestion of massive amounts of water and hail which in combination with thrust lever movement induced severe stalling in and major damage to the engine compressors."  Some 63 people on board and nine on the ground died as a result of the accident.
22 August 1985British Airtours Flight 28M – an engine failed during take-off from Manchester Airport and a fire spread into the cabin, resulting in 55 fatalities aboard the Boeing 737-236 Advanced.
6 September 1985Midwest Express Flight 105 – NTSB concluded that an unconfined failure of the 9th - 10th stage compressor spacer occurred immediately after takeoff from Milwaukee Mitchell International Airport (then called Billy Mitchell Field). The plane was observed to have slowed significantly as a result of the engine loss and experienced an accelerated stall condition. The plane rolled to the right 90 degrees and crashed just south of the runway, resulting in 31 fatalities (all passengers and crew) aboard the McDonnell-Douglas DC-9 aircraft.
3 May 1991 Ryan Airlines – Unconfined failure of 9th stage compressor disc penetrated fuel lines and fuselage on the tarmac at Bradley International Airport causing fire and complete loss of aircraft.  No fatalities reported.
21 December 1991Scandinavian Airlines Flight 751 – The engines on an MD-81 ingested wing ice during takeoff causing engine damage that led to a total loss of thrust on both engines. The aircraft crashed in a forest clearing with no fatalities.
6 July 1996An engine explosion happened on an MD-88, Delta Air Lines Flight 1288, just prior to take-off at Pensacola, Florida, USA, with two fatalities.
15 April 2008A DC-9-51 operated by Hewa Bora Airways crashed and burned at Goma following an engine fire, with 40 fatalities.
10 July 2019A McDonnell Douglas MD-88 operated by Delta landed safely after an engine failure.
2 July 2021 Transair Flight 810 – One engine on the Boeing 737-200 cargo aircraft failed en route from Honolulu to the neighboring Hawaiian island of Maui. Both pilots were rescued by the United States Coast Guard.
19 October 2021 A Privately Owned MD-87 was recorded on its takeoff roll just after throttling up a "puff of smoke" was observed from the left engine nacelle.  Subsequently the aircraft rolled off the end of the runway into a grass field and caught fire. The MD-87 was almost completely destroyed by the resulting fire.    The privately owned jet, N987AK McDonnell Douglas MD-87, owned by J. Alan Kent Development LLC, was chartering sports fans to Boston for the ALCS Championship Baseball Games.  Only 1 minor injury and no fatalities occurred on this incident.  It is still under active investigation.

Specifications (JT8D-219)

See also

References

External links

Pratt & Whitney - JT8D page 

Low-bypass turbofan engines
JT8D
1960s turbofan engines